Osvaldo Isaías Mathon Miranda (November 3, 1915 – April 20, 2011) was an Argentine film and television actor whose credits also included more than fifty stage productions.

He was born in Villa Crespo neighbourhood, in Buenos Aires, to Spanish immigrants. Miranda began his career as a tango dancer. His film credits included Cita en las estrellas in 1949 and Los muchachos de antes no usaban gomina in 1969. Miranda also appeared in numerous television roles including Mi cuñado, La nena and the long-running television series, Escala Musical.

Miranda was the namesake of the Argentine electropop group, Miranda!.

Miranda died on April 20, 2011, in Buenos Aires at the age of 95.

Selected filmography
 The Boys Didn't Wear Hair Gel Before (1937)
 Sensational Kidnapping (1942)
 Christmas with the Poor (1947)
 White Horse Inn (1948)
 The Honourable Tenant (1951)

References

External links

1915 births
2011 deaths
Argentine male film actors
Argentine male television actors
Argentine male stage actors
Argentine people of Spanish descent
Male actors from Buenos Aires
Illustrious Citizens of Buenos Aires
Burials at La Chacarita Cemetery